Mesuli Vuba (born 4 February 1997) is a South African cricketer. He made his List A debut for South Western Districts in the 2018–19 CSA Provincial One-Day Challenge on 4 November 2018. He made his first-class debut for South Western Districts in the 2018–19 CSA 3-Day Provincial Cup on 14 February 2019. He made his Twenty20 debut for South Western Districts in the 2019–20 CSA Provincial T20 Cup on 14 September 2019.

References

External links
 

1997 births
Living people
South African cricketers
South Western Districts cricketers
Place of birth missing (living people)